Ceraticelus bulbosus is a species of dwarf spider in the family Linyphiidae. It is found in North America, the Netherlands, Germany, Poland, Finland, and a range from Russia (Europe to Far East).

References

Linyphiidae
Articles created by Qbugbot
Spiders described in 1882